M. Pannerselvam was an Indian politician and former Member of the Legislative Assembly of Tamil Nadu. He was elected to the Tamil Nadu legislative assembly as a Dravida Munnetra Kazhagam candidate from Sirkazhi constituency in the 1967 and 1971 elections. He is the present MLA of Sirkazhi. He is a very honest man who works for the people's wellbeing without the intention to earn money.

References 

Living people
Dravida Munnetra Kazhagam politicians
People from Vellore district
Year of birth missing (living people)
Tamil Nadu MLAs 1971–1976